Monte Caseros is a city in the south-east of the province of Corrientes in the Argentine Mesopotamia. It is the head town of the department of the same name, which comprises also the municipalities of Colonia Libertad, Juan Pujol and Mocoretá.

The city lies on the west bank of the Uruguay River, opposite Bella Unión, Uruguay, about 440 km east-southeast of the provincial capital (Corrientes) and 640 km north of  Buenos Aires.

Climate

References

 Municipality of Monte Caseros - Official website.
 Diario del Bicentenario, edición digital del Periódico Contexto - Noticias e Información de la ciudad de Monte Caseros.
 Guía Online Turística, Comercial, Empresarial y Cultural de la Ciudad de Monte Caseros, Corrientes
 

Populated places in Corrientes Province
Uruguay River